Anandamath ( Anondomôţh) ( The Abbey of Bliss) is a Bengali historical novel, written by Bankim Chandra Chattopadhyay and published in 1882. It is inspired by and set in the background of the Sannyasi Rebellion in the late 18th century, it is considered one of the most important novels in the history of Bengali and Indian literature. Its first English publication was titled The Abbey of Bliss (literally Ananda=Bliss and Math=Abbey).

Vande Mataram, "Hail to the Bengal Motherland ", first song to represent Bengal  - as the Motherland was published in this novel.

Plot summary
The book is set in the years during the famine in Bengal in 1770 CE. It starts with introduction to a couple, Mahendra and Kalyani, who are stuck at their village Padachinha without food and water in the times of famine. They decide to leave their village and move to the next closest city where there is a better chance of survival. During the course of events, the couple gets separated and Kalyani has to run through the forest with her infant to avoid getting caught by robbers. After a long chase, she loses consciousness at the bank of a river. A Hindu “Santana”( who were not true sanyasis but common people who took the symbol of sanyasis and left their household so as to rebel against the British East India Company), Jiban took the daughter to his home handing her to his sister while he shifted Kalyani to his ashram.

The husband, Mahendra, at this point is more inclined towards joining the brotherhood of the monks and serving the Mother Nation. Kalyani wants to help him in attaining his dreams by trying to kill herself, thereby relieving him of worldly duties. At this point, Mahatma Satya joins her but before he can help her, he is arrested by the East India Company soldiers, because other monks were fuelling the revolt against Company rule. While being dragged away he spots another monk who is not wearing his distinctive robes and sings,

The other monk deciphers the song, rescues Kalyani and the baby, taking them to a rebel monk hideout. Concurrently, Kalyani's husband, Mahendra, is also given shelter by the monks, and they are reunited. The leader of the rebels shows Mahendra the three faces of Bharat Mata (Mother India) as three goddess idols being worshipped in three consecutive rooms:
 What Mother Was – An idol of Goddess Jagaddhatri
 What Mother Has Become – An idol of Goddess Kali
 What Mother Will Be – An idol of Goddess Durga

Gradually, the rebel influence grows and their ranks swell. Emboldened, they shift their headquarters to a small brick fort. The East India Company attack the fort with a large force. The rebels blockade the bridge over the nearby river, but they lack any artillery or military training. In the fighting, the East India Company make a tactical retreat over the bridge. The Sannyasis undisciplined army, lacking military experience, chases the East India Company forces into the trap. Once the bridge is full of rebels, the East India Company artillery opens fire, inflicting severe casualties.

However, some rebels manage to capture some of the cannons, and turn the fire back on to the East India Company lines. The East India Company forces are forced to fall back, the rebels winning their first battle. The story ends with Mahendra and Kalyani building a home again, with Mahendra continuing to support the rebels.

The song Vande Mataram is sung in this novel. Vande Mataram means "I bow to thee, Mother". It inspired freedom fighters in the 20th century and its first two stanzas became the national song of India after independence.

 Characters 
 Mahendra: A zamindar from Padachihna, who later joins the freedom struggle. A wealthy Zamindar (landed gentry), living in Padachihna with his wife (Kalyani) and daughter (Sukumari). They are forced to leave the village to find a new mode of living. Mahendra is initiated to the Anandamath by Mahatma Satya. The Guru orders Mahendra to use his wealth to manufacture ammunition for the Anandamath.Mahatma Satya: An ascetic who leads a band of rebels. The founder and main Guru of Anandamath, a rebel group to oppose Company rule in India. His disciples are required to renounce their attachments until India is freed. Mahatma Satya was acting upon the orders of his Guru, a mysterious saint, who explains his true motives. The Guru explains Mahatma Satya that Indians need objective knowledge from the East India Company to once more understand the subtle truths of the ancient scriptures. Mahatma Satya goes with his Guru to the Himalayas for penances.Bhavan: A brave commander of Anandamath who dies during the battle against the East India Company.Jiban: A member of the band of rebels and a brave warrior. The most accomplished and loyal disciple of Mahatma Satya . He rescues Mahendra's family and reunites them. His wife and lover, Shanti, later becomes the first and only woman to join the Anandamath and fights alongside Jiban . In the end Jiban is grievously injured in battle but is revived by Shanti. The young married couple decide to go on a pilgrimage and live as ascetics. Nabin a.k.a. Shanti''': She is the tomboyish daughter of a Brahmin and is well educated. Shanti was orphaned at a young age and became physically fit and strong. Shanti met Jiban who married her out of pity as Shanti had no one to take care of her. Jiban left Shanti as a part of renouncing his attachments and to fight for Anandamath. Shanti is left in the care of Jiban's married sister, Nimmi . However, Shanti is deeply in love with her husband and cannot bear to live away from him. She disguises herself as a man and joins Anandamath as a freedom fighter. Mahatma Satya tries to forbid her from entering, but he is shocked at Shanti's physical strength when she strings a mighty bow which only he, Jiban, Bhavan and Jnan were the only Sannyasis to be able to do so. Mahatma Satya also allows Shanti to stay and gives her the name Nabin  . Shanti rescues Kalyani from dacoits. She gathers intelligence from the East India Company and fights in battles alongside her husband. At the end of the battle, at nightfall, Shanti discovers Jiban's seemingly lifeless body and grieves for him. Mahatma Satya gives Shanti a herb, with which she revives Jiban. Shanti suggests Jiban that they go on a pilgrimage and live together in a forest as ascetics, to which her husband reluctantly agrees.

Commentary
The plot background was based on the devastating Bengal famine of 1770 during the period of Company rule in India and unsuccessful Sannyasi rebellion. Bankim Chandra Chatterjee imagined untrained but disciplined Sannyasi soldiers fighting and beating the experienced East India Company forces.

Film adaptation
The novel was later adapted into a film, Anand Math'' in 1952, directed by Hemen Gupta, starring Prithviraj Kapoor, Bharat Bhushan, Pradeep Kumar, Ajit and Geeta Bali. The music was composed by Hemant Kumar, who gave a version of the Vande Mataram sung by Lata Mangeshkar, which became a cult success.

References

External links

Online edition of English translation of Anandamath, Oxford University Press

1882 novels
Novels by Bankim Chandra Chattopadhyay
Literature of Indian independence movement
Novels set in India
Fiction set in 1771
Indian historical novels
Indian historical novels in Bengali
Indian Bengali-language novels
Indian novels adapted into films
19th-century Indian novels